Zeck is a surname. Notable people with the surname include:

 Arnold Zeck, a fictional character in the Nero Wolfe crime novels by Rex Stout
 Emil Hermann Zeck (1891–1963), Australian entomologist and scientific illustrator
 Mike Zeck (born 1949), American comic book illustrator
 Nick Zeck (born 1983), American football player